"" is the secret rock bar tour which Shiina Ringo performed in a band in 2000, or is the live video with the same title as this tour by Shiina Ringo released on December 7, 2000. 
This video was released with the video of "".
The distributor is Toshiba EMI.

Outline
Shiina Ringo went on this tour in the name of the "Hatsuiku Status" which is the band name instead of in the name of "Shiina Ringo" at the beginning. 
This band and the songs performed on this tour were named using the word relevant to child-care, botany, or gardening.

This video records the live at the Shinjuku liquid room on July 8 with the image of other performance at four places, and the documentaries about the process of the music production, and so on.

Track listing
 Documentary
 the process of the music production and the practice scene

Live
  
  
  
  
  
  
  
  
 

 Secret
 After the end roll, the scene on which the band members chat while eating sweets is projected soon.

 All lyrics by Shiina Ringo, and track 2 is with Hatsuiku Status. 
 All music by Shiina Ringo, and track 2 is with Torii Yasunobu, 4 is with Murata junko, 7 is with Tabuchi Hisako. 
 All arrangements by Hatsuiku Status.

Hatsuiku Status 
 is the unusual band including three bassists which Shiina Ringo formed with her friends.
Many of songs which they played were connected with "growth" of their band name, and they were named in relation to the growth of the plant.
This band halted activity by going on the nationwide tour only once.

Personnel 
 Vocals, electric bass guitar: 椎名林檎 Shiina Ringo
 Electric bass guitar: 村田純子 Junko Murata (from Hachioji Gulliver which Shiina formed with her in her amateur days)
 Electric guitar: 田渕ひさ子 Hisako Tabuchi (from Number Girl, toddle, Bloodthirsty Butchers)
 Electric bass guitar: 鳥井泰伸 Yasunobu Torii (from Panicsmile, Gaji)
 Drums: 吉村由加 Yuka Yoshimura (Catsuomaticdeath, Metalchicks, ex. DMBQ, ex. Hydro-Guru, ex. OOIOO, ex. Mensu)

Gokiritsu Japon 
"" is the title of the tour by Hatsuiku Status in 2000.

Tour Schedule 
 June 27, Shiina Ringo Hatsuiku Status @ Fukuoka Drum Logos "Gokiritsu Japon - Hatsuiku Status vs Rolettasecohan"
 June 29, Shiina Ringo Hatsuiku Status @ Hiroshima Namiki Junction "Gokiritsu Japon - Hatsuiku Status vs Dosanko Anal"
 July 4, Shiina Ringo Hatsuiku Status @ Kobe Chicken George "Gokiritsu Japon - Hatsuiku Status vs Elephant Morning Call"
 July 8, Shiina Ringo Hatsuiku Status @ Shinjuku liquid room "Gokiritsu Japon - Hatsuiku Status vs Handsome Brothers"

Set list
Hatsuiku Status performed 4 times, but the set lists were all the same.

Notes

External links 
 Official toddle site 
 Official Bloodthirsty Butchers site 
 Official Metalchicks & Catsuomaticdeath (Drums: Yoshimura Yuka) site 

Ringo Sheena video albums